Timothy II Marmarinos was Ecumenical Patriarch of Constantinople from 1612 to 1620.

Life
Timothy II Marmarinos was born in Bandırma, on the southern shore of the Sea of Marmara. On 28 February 1601, he became metropolitan of Patras, an office he maintained till he became Patriarch of Constantinople. After the deposition of Neophytus II in October 1612, the Church of Constantinople was temporally left in the care of Cyril Lucaris as locum tenens because of his position as Greek Patriarch of Alexandria. Cyril Lucaris was close to being appointed as patriarch but four bishops opposed and obtained the election of Timothy, one of their own, as Patriarch thanks to a promise to the Ottoman Sultan to increase the annual fee paid by the Patriarchate to 8,000 kuruş. Thus after 21 days of interregnum Lucaris gave up and at end October or in November 1612 Timothy became the Patriarch of Constantinople.

Timothy remained a fierce opponent of Lucaris, whom he forced to retire on Mount Athos. Timothy obtained an arrest warrant against Lucaris, but the latter fled back to Alexandria in Egypt. Timothy also denounced Lucaris as a Lutheran.

The reason for Timothy's opposition to Lucaris did not originate with any alignment with the latter's main enemies, i.e. the Catholics, who opposed Lucaris's pro-Protestant attitude. Timothy also maintained an anti-Catholic attitude, even if in 1615 he wrote a deferential letter to Pope Paul V.

In 1614, Timothy rebuilt and expanded the small Church of St. George in the Fanar, that since 1601 had become the See of the Patriarchate.

Timothy II died on 3 September 1620, or in March 1621 according to other sources. At the time rumors spread that he had been poisoned at a dinner given by the Dutch ambassador, a supporter of Lucaris, but no proof exists.

Notes

17th-century Ecumenical Patriarchs of Constantinople
1620 deaths
17th-century Greek clergy
People from Bandırma
Anatolian Greeks
Year of birth unknown
Orthodox bishops of Patras
Simony